Jacqui Uttien (born 11 December 1964) is a former Australian racing cyclist. She finished in second place in the Australian National Road Race Championships in 1990. She also competed in the women's road race at the 1992 Summer Olympics.

References

External links

1964 births
Living people
Australian female cyclists
People from Rift Valley Province
Olympic cyclists of Australia
Cyclists at the 1992 Summer Olympics